Jordan Smelker (born June 19, 1992) is an American ice hockey player who currently plays for the Boston Pride in the National Women's Hockey League during the 2015–16 NWHL season. Before joining the Pride, Smelker played for the Boston Blades, which she helped capture the 2015 Clarkson Cup, thus becoming the first Alaskan-born player to win the Cup. In 2016, Smelker won Isobel Cup with the Boston Pride.

Career

NCAA
In the NCAA, Smelker played with the RPI Engineers women's ice hockey team at Rensselaer Polytechnic Institute. Leading the team in scoring as a sophomore, she was nominated for ECAC Hockey's Best Defensive Forward Award in the aftermath of her senior season.

CWHL
Smelker joined in the Boston Blades in the CWHL for their 2014/15 season. At the end of her rookie season in the CWHL, she ranked 18th overall in league scoring, tied with Natalie Spooner and Laura Fortino. Smelker won the 2015 Clarkson Cup playing for the Boston Blades.

NWHL
In 2015, Smelker signed as a free agent with the Boston Pride in the National Women's Hockey League, playing on a line with Hilary Knight and Brianna Decker. As part of the Boston Pride, Smelker won the inaugural 2016 Isobel Cup.

In 2016, it was reported that Smelker signed a $14,000 one-year contract to continue with the Boston Pride for the 2016/17 NWHL season. In May 2017, Smelker re-signed with the Boston Pride for the 2017/18 season.

Smelker recorded a goal and an assist in the  3rd NWHL All-Star Game

References

External links
 
 
 Jordan Smelker (RPI Engineers 2013-14) at RPI Athletics
 

1992 births
Living people
American women's ice hockey forwards
Boston Blades players
Boston Pride players
Clarkson Cup champions
Isobel Cup champions
Premier Hockey Federation players
Rensselaer Polytechnic Institute alumni
RPI Engineers women's ice hockey players